Hypolytrum pseudomapanioides is a species of plant in the family Cyperaceae. It is endemic to Cameroon. Its natural habitat is subtropical or tropical moist montane forests. It is threatened by habitat loss.

References

Cyperaceae
Flora of Cameroon
Endangered plants
Plants described in 2005
Taxonomy articles created by Polbot